Oswald Asheton Critchley (1864 – 1935 in London, England) was a former Canadian territorial level politician, rancher and also served as a soldier in the Canadian Forces during World War I.

Personal life
Critchley began ranching in Southern Alberta in the 1880s. He purchased the Stapleton Ranch which was situated on the Bow River. His  first wife, Maria Newbolt, had two sons. She died during the birth of her second son. Critchley quickly remarried to Ms. Winifred Holt.

Political career
In the 1894 Northwest Territories general election Critchley ran for a seat in the West Calgary electoral district. He defeated two other candidates coming out on top of a close three-way split to capture the district.

Critchley only served in the Northwest Territories Legislature for a single term, choosing not to run again at the dissolution of the Legislature in 1898. He sold his first ranch a year later in 1899 and returned to England.

Post political life
He moved back to Alberta and returned to ranching. In 1909, he purchased the Bell-Irving ranch in Grand Valley and continued ranching until the outbreak of World War I. He enlisted in the Canadian Expeditionary Force with his two sons. All three served with Lord Strathcona's Horse and saw combat in France. After the war he moved back to London, England and stayed the rest of his life until he died in 1935.

References

1864 births
1935 deaths
Members of the Legislative Assembly of the Northwest Territories
Canadian military personnel of World War I
Canadian Expeditionary Force officers
Military personnel from London
Lord Strathcona's Horse officers